Orumba South is a Local Government Area in Anambra State, south-eastern Nigeria. Umunze is the headquarters of Orumba South. Other towns that make up the local government are Akpujiogu (Akpu), Umuomaku, Eziagu, Ezira, Ihite,  Nkerehi, Nawfija, Ogboji, Ogbunka, Owerre-Ezukala, Agbudu, Onneh, Isulo, Enugwu-Umuonyia.

Schools
Here is the list of secondary schools in Orumba South Local Government Area:
 All Saints Secondary School, Umunze
Community High School, Umunze
 Community Secondary School, Eziagu
 Government Technical College Umunze
 Community Secondary School, Ihite
 Community High School, Nawfija
 New Bethel Secondary School, Isulo
 Victory High School, Ezira
 Premier Secondary School, Ogbunka
 Girls’ Secondary School, Ogbunka
 Union Secondary School, Owere Ezukala
 Community Secondary School, Owere Ezukala
 Community High School, Ogboji
 Union Secondary School, Umuomaku
Community Secondary School Enugwu-Umuonyia.
St Dominic's Savio seminary, Akpujiogu.
Blessed father Tansi secondary school Akpujiogu

Notable people
Ben Nwankwo, who also represented the area in the Federal House of Representatives
Godwin Maduka, Nigerian doctor, businessman, philanthropist and the founder of Las Vegas Pain Institute and Medical Center
Paschaline Alex Okoli, Nigerian Actress best known as Cordelia in Jenifa's Diary

References
LOCAL GOVERNMENT AREAS IN ANAMBRA STATE dated July 21, 2007; accessed October 4, 2007 

Saint Dominic's Savio Seminary School, Akpu
Blessed Father Tansi Secondary School, Akpu

Local Government Areas in Anambra State
Local Government Areas in Igboland